Leonidas Pappas (born 25 October 1967) is a Greek wrestler. He competed in the men's Greco-Roman 82 kg at the 1992 Summer Olympics.

References

1967 births
Living people
Greek male sport wrestlers
Olympic wrestlers of Greece
Wrestlers at the 1992 Summer Olympics
Sportspeople from Vlorë